Shortcut is a Swedish-language magazine and meeting place centred on work and lifestyle. The magazine was established in January 1999. It is published bimonthly and aims at people with higher education, entrepreneurs, free agents and self-taught people.

References

External links
Shortcut site

Bi-monthly magazines published in Sweden
Lifestyle magazines
Magazines established in 1999
Magazines published in Sweden
Swedish-language magazines
1999 establishments in Sweden